Ranbir Singh Pora Assembly constituency is one of the 87 constituencies in the Jammu and Kashmir Legislative Assembly of Jammu and Kashmir a north state of India. Ranbir Singh Pora is also part of Jammu Lok Sabha constituency.

Member of Legislative Assembly

 1962: Bhagat Chhaju Ram, National Conference
 1967: K. Singh, Indian National Congress
 1972: Rangil Singh, Indian National Congress
 1977: Janak Raj, Indian National Congress
 1983: Janak Raj, Indian National Congress
 1985: Mufti Mohammad Sayeed, Indian National Congress
 1987: Ranjit Singh, Indian National Congress
 1996: Ram Chand, Bahujan Samaj Party
 2002: Suman Lata Bhagat, Indian National Congress
 2008: Prof. Gharu Ram Bhagat, Bharatiya Janata Party

Election results

2014

See also
 Ranbir Singh Pora
 List of constituencies of Jammu and Kashmir Legislative Assembly

References

Assembly constituencies of Jammu and Kashmir
Jammu district